Jane Langley is a painter, teacher and environmentalist born in 1959. She is the CEO and Founder of the social enterprise company Blue Patch. Blue Patch launched in Herne Hill, London on September 28, 2014. Langley studied at The Royal College of Art, Camberwell, and Chelsea School of Art. She was awarded the Sotheby's Fellowship for Painting in 1991 and was made an Abbey Scholar at the British School of Rome in 1993. In 2008 she was visiting fellow, at Goldsmiths, University of London, attached to the Constance Howard Resource and Research Centre in Textiles. Jane Langley is a 2014 London Leader for Sustainability  (London Sustainable Development Commission, City Hall, London).

She is also a curator and one of the founders of The Pattern Lab, which was discussed on UK Radio 4 Woman's Hour in an interview titled "Exploding The Teardrop", a curatorial umbrella group that brings artists, filmmakers, musicians and people from different fields of practice, together to research concepts around fine art, textiles, pattern and craft.

Originally a teacher for 27 years, she has worked with undergraduates and post graduate fine artist students at the Byam Shaw School of Art, Goldsmiths and Central Saint Martins. She taught at City and Guilds of London Art School.

July 2009 Jane Langley launched the online climate change and environmental project for young people Cool it Schools. The project is now closed and archived at the British Library UK Web Archives. Cool it Schools was inspired by a lecture on climate change called 'Hot, Flat, and Crowded' given by environmentalist Thomas Friedman at R.I.B.A. in October 2008. Cool it Schools provided children with a creative and positive way into learning and caring for the environment. Cool it Schools was a Biodiversity Education Partner with the Natural History Museum for the International Year of Biodiversity (IYB-UK).

Blue Patch is Jane Langley's current project. A social enterprise and a cooperative community for sustainable and local SMEs from across the British Isles. 
A theory of economic change, Blue Patch is designed to flow financial resources and stimulate employment to help  low-carbon local communities. On October 1, 2016, Jane Langley launched the UK's First Pop-Up Sustainable Department Store in London. Blue Patch's theory is related to the political writings of William Morris.

References

External links
 Blue Patch
 Britain's First Pop-Up Sustainable Department Store, London 2016
 Blue Sky Thinking
 Lloyds Banking Group article

1959 births
English women painters
Living people
Academics of the Byam Shaw School of Art
21st-century British women artists
21st-century English women
21st-century English people